The 2019 Southland Conference men's basketball tournament was the postseason men's basketball tournament for the 2018–19 season in the Southland Conference. The tournament was held at the Merrell Center in Katy, Texas from March 13–16, 2019.  The tournament winner, Abilene Christian, received an automatic invitation to the 2019 NCAA Division I men's basketball tournament.

Seeds
Teams were seeded by record within the conference, with a tie–breaker system to seed teams with identical conference records. Only the top eight teams in the conference qualified for the tournament. The top two seeds received double byes into the semifinals in the merit-based format. The No. 3 and No. 4 seeds received single byes to the quarterfinals.
Sam Houston St clinched a double bye, and won the 2019 Southland regular season title on February 27. Because of this, the Bearkats clinched the 1 seed. New Orleans, Lamar, Abilene Christian, and Southeast Louisiana qualified for the tournament. Abilene Christian and Southeastern Louisiana clinched the 2nd and 3rd seeds respectively with wins on March 6.

Schedule

Source

Bracket

Awards and honors
Tournament MVP: Jaren Lewis (Abilene Christian)All-Tournament Team:'''

 Jaren Lewis (Abilene Christian)
 Jaylen Franklin (Abilene Christian)
 Payten Ricks (Abilene Christian)
 Scott Plaisance Jr. (New Orleans)
 Josh Nzeakor (Lamar)

Source:

See also
2019 Southland Conference women's basketball tournament
Southland Conference men's basketball tournament

References

External links
 * 2019 Southland Conference Basketball Tournament

Southland Conference men's basketball tournament
2018–19 Southland Conference men's basketball season
Southland Conference men's basketball
Sports competitions in Katy, Texas
College basketball tournaments in Texas